Siphiwe Lusizi (born August 5, 1989 in Mdantsane) is a South African boxer. At the 2012 Summer Olympics, he competed in the Men's welterweight, and defeated Ahmad Abdul-Karim of Iraq on points, but was defeated in the second round by Gabriel Maestre of Venezuela.

At the 2014 Commonwealth Games, he competed in the men's middleweight (75 kg) division.  He beat Imrod Bartholomew and Eric Finau before losing to Northern Ireland's Connor Coyle in the quarterfinals.

References

External links
 
 

1989 births
Living people
People from Mdantsane
South African male boxers
Welterweight boxers
Olympic boxers of South Africa
Boxers at the 2012 Summer Olympics
Boxers at the 2014 Commonwealth Games
Commonwealth Games competitors for South Africa
African Games bronze medalists for South Africa
African Games medalists in boxing
Competitors at the 2011 All-Africa Games
Sportspeople from the Eastern Cape
21st-century South African people